This is a list of Italian regions by highest point. There are 20 regions, but in one case (Serra Dolcedorme) the highest point is shared between two of them (Basilicata and Calabria), so there are only 19 highest points listed.

List

References

See also

List of mountains of Italy
List of volcanoes in Italy

Highest
Mountains of Italy
 
Italian regions